Holy Sepulchre Cemetery is a Catholic cemetery in Rochester, in the U.S. state of New York. The cemetery is across Lake Avenue from Riverside Cemetery.

Notable burials 
 Patrick Barry, co-founder of the Ellwanger & Barry Nursery that helped change Rochester from the "Flour City" to the "Flower City"
 Mabel Boll, socialite known as the "Queen of Diamonds"
 Raymond J. Bowman, United States Army infantryman who served in World War II and the subject of several notable photographs taken by Robert Capa that were published in Life magazine
 Louise Brooks, famous silent film actress
 Assunta Cantisano, co-founder of Ragú
 Richard J. Curran, Mayor of Rochester and Medal of Honor recipient
 Red Dooin, catcher and manager for the Philadelphia Phillies
 James P.B. Duffy, congressman
 Jean Giambrone, Rochester's "First Lady of Sports," the first female to be awarded full press credentials at the Masters Tournament in Augusta, Georgia
 Edward D. Hoch, author of detective fiction
 Bishop Bernard McQuaid, first Bishop of the Roman Catholic Diocese of Rochester, New York.
 George Mogridge, pitcher for the New York Yankees and Washington Senators and other teams
 Colonel Patrick O'Rorke, civil war hero
 Ralph E. Quattrociocchi, state senator
 Richard Rober, Hollywood actor and native of Rochester
 Francis Tumblety, Jack the Ripper suspect
 Catherine de Valera Wheelwright, mother of Éamon de Valera

All Souls Chapel 

All Souls Chapel is an historic chapel located in the east division of Holy Sepulchre Cemetery.  Built in 1876, commissioned by Bishop Bernard McQuaid, and designed by Andrew Jackson Warner, this chapel embodies the Early English Gothic style of architecture.  It is constructed of Medina sandstone and contains stained glass windows by P. Nicholas of Holland.  The interior features ornate hammer beams hand carved by local carpenter Dominic Mura.  The altar is a white marble trimmed in black marble and a base of Tennessee pink marble built by the Hall Company of Boston.  Several ornate ceiling panels and other intricate adornment throughout the structure was completed by artist Chester F. Leiderson.  The lower level of the chapel contains a morgue initially used for storage of bodies that could not be buried when the ground was frozen.  In addition, a series of crypts were constructed for the burial of the Bishops of the Roman Catholic Diocese of Rochester, New York.

References

External links 

 
 Rochester Wiki Page – information, photos and links

Geography of Rochester, New York
Roman Catholic cemeteries in New York (state)
Cemeteries in Monroe County, New York
Tourist attractions in Rochester, New York
1871 establishments in New York (state)
Buildings and structures in Rochester, New York